This is a list of seasons played by Ross County Football Club in Scottish football from when they were admitted to the Scottish Football League in 1994 to the present day.

Key

Key to divisions
 Premier League – Scottish Premier League
 Premiership – Scottish Premiership
 First Division – Scottish Football League First Division
 Second Division – Scottish Football League Second Division
 Third Division – Scottish Football League Third Division

Key to positions and symbols
  – Champions
  – Runners-up
  – 3rd place
  – Promoted
  – Relegated

Key to rounds
GS - Group Stage
R1 – Round 1, etc.
QF – Quarter-finals
SF – Semi-finals
 – Runners-up
 – Winners

Seasons

Since joining the SPFL Pyramid, Ross County have gained 4 promotions and 2 relegations.

Notes

References

Seasons
 
Ross County